The Faculty of Arts at Comenius University in Bratislava in Slovakia was founded in 1921 and has several academic departments.

The Department of Journalism was formed in 1992 with a merger of three older departments. It can be dated back to 1952 when it was named the Department of Newspapering and Librarianship. The chairman of the department is Ján Hacek, PhD.

There is also a Department of Philosophy.

Students in the British and American Studies Department started an English-language comedy troupe.

See also
Studia Academica Slovaca

References

Further reading
 

Comenius University